Yogesh 'Yogie' Krishna Chandra Maganti (born 6 September 1973) is an Indian director who works in Telugu film industry. He is associated with successful directors Ram Gopal Varma and E. Nivas.

Yogie was born in Eluru, Andhra Pradesh.

He directedOka Raju Oka Rani (2003) for Ushakiran Movies. The producer was Ramoji Rao and the film starred Ravi Teja as the hero, and Namitha as the heroine.

He then directed a Telugu film with Venkatesh named Chintakayala Ravi. It is a romantic comedy. Nallamalapu Srinivas(Bujji) produced the movie. The film was released in 2008.

Filmography as director 

 Oka Raju Oka Rani (2003)
 Chintakayala Ravi (2008)
 Jadoogadu (2015)

Filmography as an assistant director 

 Love Ke Liye Kuch Bhi Karega (2001) (first assistant director)
 Shool (1999) (first assistant director)
 Prema Katha  (1999)  (second assistant director)
 Daud: Fun on the Run  (1997) (second assistant director)
 Anaganaga Oka Roju (1997) (second assistant director)
 Deyyam (1996) (second assistant director)
 Rangeela(1995) (second assistant director: Telugu)... aka Full of Colour (USA:TV title)
 Govindha Govindha (1993)(assistant director)
 Gaayam  (1993) (assistant director)

References

External links
 

Living people
Telugu people
1973 births